Kakabeka Generating Station is a hydroelectric facility operated by Ontario Power Generation on the bank of the Kaministiquia River,  downstream from Kakabeka Falls in the community of Kakabeka Falls, Ontario,  west of Thunder Bay. The plant provides energy to the city of Thunder Bay and area. The station is one of ten hydroelectric stations in Ontario Power Generation's Northwest Plant Group, and is remotely operated from Thunder Bay.

Kakabeka Generating Station began operating in 1906, with two hydroelectric generating units. A third unit was added in 1911, and a fourth was added in 1914. Its four units provide a peak output of 25 MW, enough energy to supply 14,000 homes.

The station is among the oldest power stations in Ontario, and much of the original equipment from 1906 is still in operation. It was owned and operated by the Kaministiquia Power Company until 1949, when it was purchased from its parent company, Abitibi Power and Paper Company, by the Hydro-Electric Power Commission of Ontario, which became Ontario Hydro in 1974. After the 1999 restructuring of Ontario Hydro, the plant came under control of Ontario Power Generation.

Overview 

It consists of a main sluice operated from Thunder Bay and six stop log sluices operated manually on-site. The intake structure is located on the eastern end of the dam and water flow into the aqueduct is controlled by three gated intake openings. Four penstocks lead from the surge chamber, one for each unit, following the natural slope of the escarpment. Each is sized appropriately for requirements of the unit at which it terminates. Penstocks carry water from the surge chamber to the generating station, which generates electricity then flows back into the Kaministiquia River.

The powerhouse contains its original Francis turbines, manufactured by J. M. Voith in Heidenheim, Germany, and its generators were made by the Canadian General Electric Corporation. It has three 7,000 HP units which produce 5.3 MW of electricity each, and a 12,000 HP unit, generating 8.7 MW, for a total output of 24.6 MW.

History 

Plans for a hydro electric plant at Kakabeka began in 1896, when Chicago entrepreneur Edward Spencer Jenison wished to serve the electricity demands of the nearby towns of Fort William and Port Arthur. Hydroelectricity at this time was in its infancy, and delivery of the electricity to its destination would prove a challenge as alternating current was a relatively new development. Shortly after gaining rights to develop the project, Jenison sold them to three Canadian businessmen, who formed the Kaministiquia Power Company.

Construction 

Construction of the facility began in September, 1905 and employed 600 men. It involved the construction of a railroad siding and temporary station on the CN line  from the falls, and the construction of a narrow gauge railway to bring equipment to the site.

The plant originally consisted of two 7,000 HP Francis turbine units, manufactured by J. M. Voith in Heidenheim, Germany, which produce 5.3 MW of electricity each. An expansion in 1911 saw the addition of a third 5 MW unit, at which point the powerhouse was expanded to its present size. In 1914, a fourth unit, generating 8.7 MW, and the third aqueduct, were added. In 1998, the three aqueducts were replaced with one large aqueduct with a  internal diameter.

See also 

 List of generating stations in Canada
 List of generating stations in Ontario

References

External links 

Ontario Power Generation Kakabeka Falls Generating Station: 100 Years.
Interactive panoramic image of the station.

Ontario Power Generation
Hydroelectric power stations in Ontario
Dams in Ontario
Buildings and structures in Thunder Bay District
Kaministiquia River
Energy infrastructure completed in 1906
Energy infrastructure completed in 1911
Energy infrastructure completed in 1914
Ontario Hydro
1911 establishments in Ontario